"A Song for St. Cecilia's Day" (1687) is the first of two odes written by the English Poet Laureate John Dryden for the annual festival of Saint Cecilia's Day observed in London every 22 November from 1683 to 1703. The ode was sponsored by the Musical Society of London and twice set to music.

Background 

Saint Cecilia was, according to her legend, a Roman virgin of rank, who flourished during the reign of Marcus Aurelius Antoninus. She was a Christian, and, by her purity of life, and constant employment in the praises of her Maker, while yet on earth, obtained intercourse with an angel. Being married to Valerianus, a Pagan, she not only prevailed upon him to abstain from using any familiarity with her person, but converted him and his brother to Christianity. They were all martyrs for the faith in the reign of Septimius Severus. Chaucer has celebrated this legend in the "Second Nonne's Tale", which is almost a literal translation from the "Golden Legend" of Jacobus Januensis. As all professions and fraternities, in ancient times, made choice of a tutelar saint, Cecilia was elected the protectress of music and musicians. It was even believed that she had invented the organ, although no good authority can be discovered for such an assertion. Her festival was celebrated from an early period by those of the profession over whom she presided.

The revival of letters, with the Restoration, was attended with a similar resuscitation of the musical art; but the formation of a Musical Society, for the annual commemoration of St Cecilia's day, did not take place until 1680. An ode, written for the occasion, was set to music by the most able professor, and rehearsed before the society and their stewards upon 22 November, the day dedicated to their patroness. The first effusions of this kind are miserable enough. Edmond Malone preserved a few verses of an ode, by an anonymous author, in 1633; that of 1684 was furnished by Oldham, whom Dryden commemorated by an elegy; that of 1685 was written by Nahum Tate. There was no performance in 1686; and, in 1687, Dryden furnished this ode, which was set to music by Draghi, an eminent Italian composer. Of the annual festival, Motteux gives the following account:

Appraisal 
According to Samuel Johnson: "In his first ode for Cecilia's day, which is lost in the splendor of the second, there are passages which would have dignified any other poet. The first stanza is vigorous and elegant, though the word diapason is too technical, and the rhymes are too remote from one another."

He continues: "The conclusion is likewise striking, but it includes an image so awful in itself, that it can owe little to poetry; and I could wish the antithesis of musick untuning had found some other place."

Settings 
Italian composer Giovanni Battista Draghi wrote the first musical arrangement for "A Song for St. Cecilia's Day" in 1687. In the 1730s, Handel wrote new musical scores for both "A Song for St. Cecilia's Day" and Dryden's second ode on the same theme, "Alexander's Feast" (1697). In 1958, American composer Norman Dello Joio once again put the ode to music in his cantata for mixed voices and piano or brass instruments, and called it "To Saint Cecilia".

References

Bibliography 

 Scott, Walter (1808). The Works of John Dryden, Now First Collected in Eighteen Volumes. Vol. 11. Edinburgh: James Ballantyne and Co. pp. 165–170. 
 Falle, G. G. (2022). "A Song for St. Cecilia's Day, 1687". RPO: Representative Poetry Online. University of Toronto Libraries. Accessed 10 March 2022.
 Bray, Roger (August 1997). "Dryden and Draghi in Harmony in the 1687 'Song for St Cecilia's Day'". Music & Letters, 78(3): pp. 319–336.
 Johnson, Samuel (1794). "Dryden". In The Lives of the Most Eminent English Poets. New ed. Vol. 2. London: T. Cadell Strand. pp. 147–148.
 Mambrol, Nasrullah (6 July 2020). "Analysis of John Dryden's Alexander's Feast". Literariness: Literary Theory and Criticism. Accessed 10 March 2022.
 Scott, Horton (23 November 2007). "A Song for St Cecilia's Day". Harper's Magazine. Accessed 10 March 2022.
 Trammell, Jena (21 February 2003). "A Song for Saint Cecilia's Day". The Literary Encyclopedia. Anderson University. Accessed 10 March 2022.
 "Norman Dello Joio: To Saint Cecilia (1958)". YouTube. 3 May 2020. Retrieved 26 December 2022.
 "St Cecilia, from A Song for St Cecilia's Day". Explore Parliament and the Royal Palace of Westminster. Accessed 4 July 2022.

1680s poems
Poetry by John Dryden
Historical poems